Tian Shan or Tianshan is a mountain range in Central Asia.

Tianshan (天山) may also refer to the following in China:

Tianshan District, Ürümqi, Xinjiang
Tianshan Town, Ar Horqin Banner, Inner Mongolia
Tianshan, Jiangsu, town in Gaoyou